Putative RNA-binding protein 11 is a protein that in humans is encoded by the RBM11 gene.

References

Further reading